Talinolol is a beta blocker.

Stereochemistry 
Talinolol contains a stereocenter and consists of two enantiomers. This is a racemate, i.e. a 1: 1 mixture of (R)- and the (S)-forms:

References

Beta blockers
Ureas
N-tert-butyl-phenoxypropanolamines
Cyclohexyl compounds